Cast a Long Shadow is a 1959 American Western film directed by Thomas Carr and starring Audie Murphy and Terry Moore. The film was based on the 1957 novel of the same name by Wayne D. Overholser.

Plot

Matt Brown inherits a cattle ranch from his father with whom he never got along. He agrees to sell to the townspeople, who want to finally work for themselves. When he arrives back in town, he visits the house and, after meeting with an old girlfriend, decides not to sell, angering the people. However, he discovers that the ranch is deep in debt and about to be foreclosed on. In order to avoid this, he has to drive the ranch's cattle to Santa Fe in three days to sell them for the money to pay off the debt. The town's men help but still conspire to get the ranch. Along the way, Matt discovers the truth about his past.

Cast
 Audie Murphy as Matt Brown
 Terry Moore as Janet Calvert
 John Dehner as Chip Donahue
 James Best as Sam Muller
 Rita Lynn as Hortensia
 Denver Pyle as Harrison
 Ann Doran as Ma Calvert
 Stacy Harris as Brown (as Stacy S. Harris)
 Robert Foulk as Hugh Rigdon
 Wright King as Noah Pringle

Production
It was one of the first films the Mirish Brothers made after they left Allied Artists.

See also
 List of American films of 1959

References

External links

1959 films
1959 Western (genre) films
American Western (genre) films
Audie Murphy
Films scored by Gerald Fried
Films directed by Thomas Carr
Films produced by Walter Mirisch
United Artists films
Films based on Western (genre) novels
1950s English-language films
1950s American films